Bellis azorica is a species of daisy in the genus Bellis. It is endemic to the Azores.

References

azorica
Endemic flora of the Azores
Plants described in 1844